Adédoyin is a unisex first name and surname of Yoruba origin. As a native name of the Yoruba culture in West Africa, its meaning is "the crown or royalty has become sweet (like honey)".

Notable people with the name include:
Adegboyega Folaranmi Adedoyin (1922–2014), Nigerian-British high jumper and long jumper
Francis Adedoyin (1922–2018), Nigerian traditional ruler
Korede Adedoyin (born 2000), Nigerian professional footballer
Olufunke Adedoyin (1962–2018), Nigerian politician
Rahmon Adedoyin (born 1957), Nigerian educationist and businessman
William Adedoyin (died 1952), Nigerian traditional ruler
Adedoyin Salami (born 1963), Nigerian economist
Adedoyin Sanni (born 1995), Nigerian footballer

Yoruba-language surnames
Yoruba given names